RTP1 (RTP um) is a Portuguese free-to-air television channel owned and operated by state-owned public broadcaster Rádio e Televisão de Portugal (RTP). It is the company's flagship television channel, and is known for broadcasting mainstream and generalist programming, including Telejornal news bulletins, prime time drama, cinema and entertainment, and major breaking news, sports and special events.

It was launched on 7 March 1957 as the first regular television service in Portugal. It was the only one until 25 December 1968, when RTP launched a second channel. Two regional channels followed, RTP Madeira on 6 August 1972 and RTP Açores on 10 August 1975. As RTP held a monopoly on television broadcasting in the country, they were the only television channels until the first commercial television was launched on 6 October 1992, when SIC started broadcasting nationwide.

The channel was initially simply referred to as "RTP". It received other names, such as "I Programa" and "RTP Canal 1" until it adopted its current name "RTP1". It is one of the most watched television networks in the country. The channel became a 24-hour service in 2002, although it now leases its graveyard slot (3:56 am to 5:59 am) to the infomercial producer and direct-response marketer, Galeria (owned by Galería del Coleccionista). Until that point, RTP1 closed down with the national anthem, but this practice stopped not too long before infomercials filled the overnight slots. Unlike RTP2, RTP1 broadcasts commercial advertising, which, along with the license fee, finances the channel.

History

Experimental broadcasts
RTP was established on 15 December 1955 as the national television service, under Article 1 of Decree nº 40 341.

Test broadcasts were first conducted on September 4, 1956, at the now-defunct Feira Popular amusement park in Lisbon. At 21:30 that evening, a speech was made by Raúl Feio, in the Nervos program, introducing viewers to television, considered at that time to be "one of the greatest revelations of our time", and stating that the television service would enter the definitive stage in 1957, with hopes for the five transmitters to be active by then, locating the transmitters on a map. The inaugural program was followed by RTP's first continuity announcer, Maria Armanda Falcão, announcing the remaining line-up for the evening. These consisted of:
Revista Desportiva: a sports program fronted by Domingos Lança Moreira, featuring an interview with the winner of the 1956 Volta a Portugal, Alves Barbosa;
A filmed documentary about Lisboa, produced by Fernando Garcia;
Música e Artistas, featuring a concert with violinist Leonor de Sousa Prado and pianist Nella Maissa;
Revista Mundial (the first news service), featuring among its topics the war in Algeria, flooding in Austria and a trip between Madrid and Monza in a car from 1906. The reports were provided by United Press Television.

Raúl Feio returned to finish the broadcast. The experiments continued throughout September, and tropospheric propagation helped increase the reception. These experimental broadcasts resumed on December 3, delayed from the initial plan in November. These experimental broadcasts consisted of filmed documentaries, slides and test patterns. Daily, a pre-recorded continuity announcement was made by Gina Esteves about the reception of RTP's signal and how to obtain a television set. Throughout December (excluding Sundays) the experiments consisted largely of music videos, American imports and filmed features from France made for television. The line-up plans changed in the second half of January 1957 the signal was being tested between 17:00 and 19:00 and again between 21:00 and 22:30; the tests weren't conducted on Wednesday nights. The afternoon period started with slides for 45 minutes, then 15 minutes of technical test programming, ending at 18:00, with an hour of films interspersed with slides, the second period at 21:00 started with 5 minutes of slides, then filmed content until 22:30, ending with sign-off slides. RTP broadcast 71 hours of filmed programming in the month (including fifteen documentaries made in Portugal) and 22 hours of test patterns. Regular continuity announcements were added on February 5, and on February 15, a new newscast, Jornal de Actualidades. Its first large-scale coverage of an event was the visit of Elizabeth II to Portugal.

Early years
Regular broadcasts commenced on 7 March 1957. An announcement made at the start of the broadcast stated that these broadcasts weren't definitive as of yet, seeing that the tests would run for a few more months. The broadcast started at 21:30, and with that came the first airing of the Derby Day march (by Robert Farnon) on television. RTP wanted to commission a march used to open its daily schedule, but since the task was time-consuming, the problem was then solved upon finding a bunch of Chapell discs to later select the track. The first announcer in the regular period, Maria Helena Varela Santos, announced the evening's line-up and was followed by a speech by Domingos de Mascarenhas about RTP's future. Technical problems were seen throughout the night, including a number of issues with sound.

The first televised play (Monólogos do Vaqueiro) was broadcast on March 11. The first film (Fado: História de uma Cantadeira) ran on March 13. Its first operations outside Portugal were done by the news team in Barcelona, followed by coverage of the official visit of President Craveiro Lopes to Brazil in June 1957. Another crew was sent to capture the eruption of the Capelinhos volcano in the Azores in October.

Initially, RTP had a limited coverage area, using 5 transmitters (Monsanto, Montejunto, Lousã, Monte da Virgem and Foia) that covered about 60% of the country's population. Per the 1956 yearly report, the initial goal of starting all five transmitters by March 1957 was failed, due to issues regarding the terrain that was going to be used for the building of the transmitters. The basic network wasn't complete until April 1958. By the time the network was finished, the signals were received by 58% of the population.

Out of RTP's 665 hours of programming in 1957, dozens were devoted to sports programming. Game shows were also central to RTP's launch year, the first game show was broadcast on April 5, 1957; the winning prize being a television set. Technical difficulties hit RTP frequently in its early years. João Villaret's program was hit by a swarm of bugs on October 21, 1960.

In October 1958, the administration demanded the creation of commercials made specifically for television; on December 31, 1958, an agreement was made between the radio stations members of the Pool. Advertising was the solution to curb the problems caused by the relatively high television tax. On February 9, 1958, the first soccer match was broadcast. That same year, Natal dos Hospitais was broadcast on television for the first time, and in 1959, emphasis was put on outside programming, in order to diversify its contents. Among such broadcasts was the inauguration of the Cristo-Rei statue on May 17.

On June 12, 1959, TV Rural was first broadcast. Engineer Sousa Veloso hosted it throughout its existence; the program was also relatively cheap to produce at the time of starting. Associated-Rediffusion visited Lisbon in the same month and accepted a special hour of programming, that wasn't attractive for most of its viewers, aside from a few documentaries in the Hora Inglesa strand that ran for a week. On October 18, Jornal de Actualidades was replaced by Telejornal with two editions, the main one at 20:30 with half an hour, and a late edition before sign-off, that rarely happened after 23:30. The first presenters were Mário Pires and Alberto Lopes, but the choice made by RTP was seen as flawed. The newscast suffered constant cuts from the censors, as well as technical problems

Broadcasts from the Monte da Virgem studios in Vila Nova de Gaia started on October 20, 1959.

Portugal's link to the Eurovision network was complete on December 1, 1965 and the first experiment between Portugal and Spain was made on January 31, 1966. The first broadcasts from the network was made in 1960, and with varying levels of quality.

Starting November 1, 1961, the weather reports were now seen in-vision from meteorologists, this time after the main news, as opposed to the late news, like it was before. The most famous weatherman, Anthímio de Azevedo, didn't join RTP until 1964. The 1960s also marked the arrival of the video tape technology to the broadcaster.
 A contract with Movierecord Portuguesa SARL was signed on September 26, 1962, eyeing to exploit advertising slots. At the end of 1963, Lever was the most-advertised company on television, but the most-advertised product was the Sical coffee brand. Around this time, more filmed imports started running, mostly from the United Kingdom and the United States. Under government initiative, programming for schools made its test run on January 6, 1964.

Two channels under one administration
It was the only TV channel available in Portugal until 25 December 1968, when RTP2 started broadcasting. Because of that, RTP had to identify both channels as I Programa and II Programa in order to distinguish them.

1969 was marked with one of the first successful talk-shows on Portuguese television, the variety show Zip-Zip, that ran between May and December, as well as live coverage of the moon landing.

Daytime broadcasts commenced in May 1970, with a two-hour period running at various times mostly between 12:45 and 14:30. Before then, Telescola (educational classes) were generally the first programmes of the day and the regular schedule started at 19:00, running until midnight.

RTP was occupied on April 25, 1974, by the Armed Forces Ministry, and as consequence of the occupation, had its lineup changed.

In 1974, RTP's ratings grew with the expansion of the acquisition of television sets in the country. The first colour broadcasts were conducted in 1976, with the legislative elections.

RTP 1 broadcast the first telenovela in Portugal, the Brazilian series Gabriela from TV Globo, in May 1977. Its success was extremely high, with accounts of politicians watching the series religiously. On Mondays, the telenovela was followed by the successful gameshow A Visita da Cornélia

On 16 October 1978, the channel was renamed RTP-1 (initially hyphenated). Colour programming was now in production, and a heat of Jeux Sans Frontières has to be transmitted in said technology in order to air to the rest of Europe, which already had regular colour broadcasts at the time. As the months progressed, more and more colour broadcasts were included before launching regularly on 7 March 1980.

In October 1983, the daytime period was abolished in order to save energy. Weekday broadcasts were then restricted to start at 17:00 and end at 23:00. Said broadcasts were resumed in 1985, when RTP decided to broadcast the daytime block from Oporto. The educational broadcasts (then known as Ciclo Preparatório TV) were abolished in 1988. By then, daytime shutdowns were abolished.

Towards the end of the 1980s, RTP was facing challenges with the impending arrival of private broadcasters. As a result, RTP decided to rename RTP1 as RTP Canal 1, in readiness for a bigger rebrand that happened on 17 September 1990, where the channel was now officially rebranded as Canal 1, in order to reinforce its position in front of the new broadcasters. Having lost its leadership status slowly between 1994 and 1995, owing to SIC's success, it eventually turned into the vice-leader before falling into third place, when TVI got a ratings boost.

On 29 April 1996, Canal 1 reverted to RTP1.

On 31 March 2004, RTP1 rebranded entirely now broadcasting from RTP's new headquarters.

The channel started widescreen tests on 8 June 2012 with the Euro 2012 opening ceremony and the first match (Poland vs. Greece). On 14 January 2013, the channel formally became a widescreen channel.

Logos and identities

Programs

News
 Manchetes 3 (simulcast with RTP3)
 Bom Dia Portugal
 Jornal da Tarde
 Portugal em Direto
 Edição Especial (only on special occasions)
 Última Hora (breaking news)
 Telejornal
 a prova dos factos

Variety shows
 Praça da Alegria – a daily variety talk-show broadcast on weekdays between 10 a.m. and 1 pm. It targets the more elderly and illiterate part of the population, with human interest stories, and does not broadcast in summer.
 A Nossa Tarde – another daily variety talk-show also broadcast on weekdays between 3 p.m. and 6 pm. Also features interviews, live performances and human interest stories, but with a broader target and appeal. These two talk-shows are often criticized for their long running time, less educated target demographics and for competing with other private television stations with the same format, at the same times of the day. Does not broadcast in the summer.
 Aqui Portugal
 Verão Total – is a summer show used to fill in for "Praça da Alegria" and "A Nossa Tarde". The show is broadcast from a different town every day.

TV series

Portuguese
 Auga Seca

American
 The Flash
 Longmire
 Major Crimes (Crimes Graves)
 Pinkalicious & Peterrific (La Rose de Curioso La) (upcoming)
Animaniacs

Talent-shows
 The Voice Portugal
 Got Talent Portugal

Game shows
 The Price Is Right (O Preço Certo)
 Joker

Late-night talk shows
 5 Para A Meia-Noite
 Cá Por Casa com Herman José
 Depois Vai-se A Ver E Nada
 Prova Oral

Sports

Music festivals
 NOS Alive
 MEO Marés Vivas

Documentaries or infotainment
 Portugueses pelo Mundo

Movies

Exclusive broadcasting rights
 NOS Audiovisuais
 Constantin Film
 BBC Films
 Rai Fiction
 Pathé
 Lifetime/TF1 International

Co-shared broadcasting rights
 Warner Bros./New Line Cinema (first-run rights, second-run rights co-shared with SIC)
 Columbia Pictures/TriStar Pictures (rights co-shared with SIC)
 20th Century Studios/Regency Enterprises (rights co-shared with SIC and TVI)
 Universal Studios/Focus Features (rights co-shared with SIC and TVI)

Controversies

In 1988, RTP pulled several sketches from Humor de Perdição: the last few sketches from the Historical Interviews series.

In 1995, Catholic groups and Rádio Renascença put RTP under pressure for airing the infamous "Last Supper" special edition of Herman ZAP. As a result, it and Parabéns were both pulled.

References

External links
 Official Site 
 RTP1 Live Stream on RTP Play

Television stations in Portugal
Television channels and stations established in 1957
Portuguese-language television stations
1957 establishments in Portugal
Rádio e Televisão de Portugal